Trade Arabia is a Bahrain-based online business news and information portal covering various trade and industry sectors in the Persian Gulf region, Middle East and the Levant.

References

External links
PRLog

1999 establishments in Bahrain
Web portals
Arab mass media
Middle Eastern news websites
Publications established in 1999
Arabic-language newspapers
Asian news websites